Zvi Hashin (1929–29 October 2017) was an Israeli mechanical engineer. He was a professor for engineering sciences at Tel Aviv University. In 2012, he won the Benjamin Franklin Medal in Mechanical Engineering, for his research on micro-mechanics of failure of fibre-reinforced plastic.

Publications 
 Z. Hashin, Failure criteria for unidirectional fiber composites, J. Appl. Mech.,47, 329–334 (1980).

References

External links 
 http://www.eng.tau.ac.il/~hashin/

1929 births
2017 deaths
Academic staff of Tel Aviv University
Israeli mechanical engineers
Israel Prize in technology and engineering recipients
Benjamin Franklin Medal (Franklin Institute) laureates
Technion – Israel Institute of Technology alumni
German emigrants to Israel